Phakisa Freeway  is a motor racing circuit located between Welkom and Odendaalsrus, South Africa. It is one of the few oval speedways outside of the United States and the only one in Africa.

History
Phakisa Freeway was built on the same site as the former Goldfields Raceway, which closed in 1997.

The current track opened in 1999. It consists of a  road course and a  oval course. The road course uses the oval's pit lane as its backstraight and crosses the oval's backstretch on two times.

The oval track is similar to the Las Vegas Motor Speedway in its 1997 configuration: 12 degree banking in the turns, nine degrees on the tri-oval and three degrees on the back stretch. It was built to attract American oval racing like NASCAR or IndyCar.

Events 
From 1999 to 2004, the venue hosted the South African motorcycle Grand Prix of the MotoGP championship.

The Superbike World Championship announced their intention to run at Phakisa Freeway from 2014 onwards. Due to homologation issues the series never raced at the circuit.

Since 2014, Phakisa Freeway has only hosted national events.

The only event held on the oval was the Free State 500 in 2010. The American Speed Association imported stock cars to South Africa for the race. Various drivers from South Africa, Europe and the US competed – including former NASCAR driver Geoff Bodine.

Lap records
The official race lap records at the Phakisa Freeway are listed as:

See also 
 Calder Park Raceway
 EuroSpeedway Lausitz
 Rockingham Motor Speedway
 Twin Ring Motegi

References

External links
Map and circuit information at RacingCircuits.info

South African motorcycle Grand Prix
Motorsport venues in South Africa
Grand Prix motorcycle circuits
Matjhabeng Local Municipality